Beitar Ashdod is an Israeli football club based in Ashdod. Beitar participated in the second division in the 1970s. In 1981 merged with Maccabi Ashdod to form Maccabi Ironi Ashdod in 1981. In summer 2016, the club was refounded in Liga Gimel.

History
The club was founded in the early sixties. In the 1969–70 season it was promoted to Liga Bet for the first time in its history. In 1975–76 season, Beitar hosted the first Ashdod derby against Hapoel Ashdod which ended in a 2–2 draw in front of 4000 fans. In September 1981, the club merged with Maccabi Ashdod to form Ironi Ashdod.

6 years later, Beitar members founded "Beitar Nativ Ashdod". And play in liga gimel. In 1993/94 season, the teem Promotion to liga bet. The club was dismantled in 1999.

On 31 July 2016 the club refounded in Liga Gimel and was assigned to the Center District.

External links
Beitar Ashdod Israel Football Association

References

Ashdod
Association football clubs established in 1962
Association football clubs disestablished in 1981
Association football clubs established in 2016
1962 establishments in Israel
1981 disestablishments in Israel
2016 establishments in Israel